James (or Jim or Jimmy) McMillan or MacMillan may refer to:

Sportspeople
 James McMillan (footballer, born c. 1866) (c. 1866–?), played for Sunderland
 James McMillan (footballer, born 1869) (1869–1937), played for Scotland,Everton and St Bernard's
 James McMillan (Scottish footballer), played for Notts County
 Jim McMillan (Canadian football) (born 1952), American football player
 Jim McMillan (speedway rider) (born 1945), Scottish motorcycle speedway rider
 James McMillan (cricketer) (born 1978), New Zealand cricketer

Musicians
 James MacMillan (born 1959), Scottish composer
 James McMillan (trumpeter), British jazz trumpeter, record producer and founder and owner of Quietmoney Recordings

Politicians
 James McMillan (politician) (1838–1902), U.S. Senator from Michigan
 James Bryan McMillan (1916–1995), U.S. federal judge
 Jimmy McMillan (born 1946), U.S. fringe politician, founder of Rent Is Too Damn High Party
 James E. McMillan (died 1907), mayor of Victoria, British Columbia

Other
 James McMillan (fur trader) (1783–1858), founder of Fort Langley, British Columbia
 James W. McMillan (1825–1903), Union officer during the American Civil War
 Lynching of Jim McMillan on June 18, 1919, in Alabama
 James Francis McMillan (1948–2010), Scottish historian and author
 J. W. McMillan (brick manufacturer) (1850–1925), Scottish brick manufacturer in the American South